Hypocreopsis rhododendri is an ascomycete fungus. It is commonly known as hazel gloves due to the resemblance of its orange-brown, radiating lobes to rubber gloves, and because it is found on hazel (Corylus avellana) stems.

Distribution
Hypocreopsis rhododendri is found on the hyperoceanic west coasts of Britain and Ireland, in the Atlantic Pyrenees in south western France, and in the Appalachian mountains in the eastern United States.

Habitat
In the Appalachian mountains, H. rhododendri was originally found growing on Rhododendron maximum, and was subsequently found on Kalmia latifolia and Quercus sp.

In Europe, H. rhododendri is found in Atlantic hazel woodland, mainly on hazel stems. It has never been found on Rhododendron species.

Host
Although H. rhododendri is found on woody stems, it has been suggested that it is not a wood-decay fungus, but is instead a parasite of the wood-decay fungus Hymenochaete corrugata.

References

External links

 Report on hazel gloves Hypocreopsis rhododendri, a UK BAP ascomycete fungus. English Nature Research Report.
 Hazel gloves. Scottish Natural Heritage.
 Scottish Fungi: Hazel gloves research news.

Fungi described in 1922
Fungi of Europe
Fungi of North America
Hypocreaceae